Rise FX is a German visual effects company with offices in Berlin, Munich, Stuttgart, Cologne, and London.

Rise FX has worked on several films of the Marvel Cinematic Universe like Avengers: Endgame, Captain Marvel, Ant-Man and the Wasp, Avengers: Infinity War, Black Panther,  Doctor Strange, Captain America: Civil War, Avengers: Age of Ultron, Guardians of the Galaxy, Captain America: The Winter Soldier, and Iron Man 3.

Past credits include The King's Man, Doctor Sleep, Hobbs & Shaw, Hellboy, Shazam!, Dumbo, The Fate of the Furious, Harry Potter and the Deathly Hallows, X-Men: First Class, Cloud Atlas, A Cure for Wellness, The Man from U.N.C.L.E., A Hologram for the King, Richard the Stork, Sleeping Sickness, and This Is Love. Work on TV shows includes Stranger Things, Borgia, Dark, Babylon Berlin, and Sense8.

History
Rise FX was founded in 2007 by Sven Pannicke, Robert Pinnow, Markus Degen, and Florian Gellinger. International breakthrough happened after their work on This Is Love when Marvel Studios contacted them.

Rise Pictures
Rise Pictures (Rise PX) is Rise FX's production unit, currently co-producing Dragon Rider (an adaptation of Cornelia Funke's Dragon Rider) with Constantin Film.

References

External links
 http://www.risefx.com
 http://www.risepx.com

Companies based in Berlin
Entertainment companies established in 2007
Visual effects companies
Film production companies of Germany
Mass media in Berlin